The Conyca Geodrome is a 1.5m fixed-wing drone that specializes in topography and photogrammetric applications. It has all the legal requirements to operate in Spain. The system has totally autonomous take-off and landing operations, can present 3D terrain models with 4 cm resolution accuracy at 100 m height, and can take orthophotos. Although this system has been orientated to topography, there are surveillance and precision agriculture versions than can use infrared and hyperspectral cameras.

Specifications 
 MTOW: 2000 g
 Maximum Payload: 600 g
 Cruise speed: 20 m/s
 Max speed: 30 m/s
 Autonomy: 1h
 Max area: 130 Ha
 Wingspan: 1500 mm
 Power: 625 W
 Processor: 32-bit ARM Cortex® M4 Processor

External links 
 https://www.youtube.com/watch?v=nMJziX51taw
www.conyca.es

Unmanned aerial vehicles of Spain